Miscogaster elegans is a species of chalcid wasps  in the Pteromalidae family found in Europe.

References

External links 

 Miscogaster elegans at dyntaxa.se
 Miscogaster elegans at the Universal Chalcidoidea Database

Pteromalidae
Insects described in 1833